Wilfred Anthony Prall (born April 20, 1950) is a former Major League Baseball pitcher. Prall was drafted by the San Francisco Giants in the third round of the 1971 Major League Baseball Draft, then was traded to the Chicago Cubs in 1974 in exchange for catcher Ken Rudolph.

Cultural references
In season 1, episode 15 of the TV show Prison Break, a Cubs pitcher named "William Prall" is shown in flashback, and referred to as the favorite player of the father of one of the characters, Lincoln Burrows.

Sources

Venezuelan Winter League

1950 births
Living people
Amarillo Giants players
Baseball players from New Jersey
Chicago Cubs players
Decatur Commodores players
Great Falls Giants players
Fresno Giants players
Major League Baseball pitchers
Sportspeople from Hackensack, New Jersey
Spokane Indians players
Tigres de Aragua players
American expatriate baseball players in Venezuela
Upsala Vikings baseball players
Wichita Aeros players